In mathematics, Krener's theorem is a result attributed to Arthur J. Krener in geometric control theory about the topological properties of attainable sets of finite-dimensional control systems.  It states that any attainable set of a bracket-generating system has nonempty interior or, equivalently, that any attainable set has nonempty interior in the topology of the corresponding orbit. Heuristically, Krener's theorem prohibits attainable sets from being hairy.

Theorem
Let 
 
be a smooth control system, where 
 
belongs to a finite-dimensional manifold  and  belongs to a control set . Consider the family  of vector fields .

Remarks and consequences
the attainable set from  has nonempty interior in the orbit topology,
as it follows from Krener's theorem applied to the control system restricted to the orbit through .

This is a consequence of Krener's theorem and of the orbit theorem.

References

Control theory
Theorems in dynamical systems